Zhong Huanghao (born 14 September 1998) is a Chinese Paralympic athlete with cerebral palsy. He represented China at the 2016 Summer Paralympics in Rio de Janeiro, Brazil and he won the silver medal in the men's long jump T38 event.

At the 2017 World Para Athletics Championships held in London, United Kingdom he won the silver medal in the men's long jump T38 event.

In 2018, he competed at the 2018 Asian Para Games held in Jakarta, Indonesia where he won two silver medals and two bronze medals.

References

External links 
 

Living people
1998 births
Place of birth missing (living people)
Medalists at the 2016 Summer Paralympics
Paralympic silver medalists for China
Track and field athletes with cerebral palsy
Chinese male long jumpers
Chinese male sprinters
Paralympic medalists in athletics (track and field)
Athletes (track and field) at the 2016 Summer Paralympics
Paralympic athletes of China
21st-century Chinese people
Medalists at the 2018 Asian Para Games